The 1993/94 FIS Freestyle Skiing World Cup was the fifteenth World Cup season in freestyle skiing organised by International Ski Federation. The season started on 10 December 1993 and ended on 13 March 1994. This season included four disciplines: aerials, moguls, ballet and combined.

Men

Moguls

Aerials

Ballet

Combined

Ladies

Moguls

Aerials

Ballet

Combined

Men's standings

Overall 

Standings after 42 races.

Moguls 

Standings after 11 races.

Aerials 

Standings after 11 races.

Ballet 

Standings after 11 races.

Combined 

Standings after 9 races.

Ladies' standings

Overall 

Standings after 43 races.

Moguls 

Standings after 11 races.

Aerials 

Standings after 11 races.

Ballet 

Standings after 11 races.

Combined 

Standings after 10 races.

References

FIS Freestyle Skiing World Cup
World Cup
World Cup